Emma-Helena Nilsson, born 1975, in Östersund, Jämtland, Sweden. Formerly Miss Sweden (1999) and cross-country skier. 34th place at Vasa Ski Marathon Race in the year of 2000.

Nilsson has graduated from a school of social work and public administration. Today she supplies models at her own company. She is married to Mathias Fredriksson.

References

External links
Interview with Emma Helena
Emma Helena's recruitment model website

1975 births
Living people
Miss Sweden winners
Miss Universe 1999 contestants
Swedish female cross-country skiers
People from Östersund
20th-century Swedish women